Mariano Delfino (born 30 September 1977) is a former professional tennis player from Argentina.

Career
Delfino was a qualifier in the 2003 French Open and played against Jean-Rene Lisnard in the first round. He lost the match in four sets.

His only other appearance on the ATP Tour was in the 2003 Campionati Internazionali di Sicilia, where he and partner Sergio Roitman were doubles wildcard entrants. They won their opening round match over Austrians Julian Knowle and Jürgen Melzer, but lost in the second round to Christophe Rochus and Tom Vanhoudt.

Challenger titles

Singles: (3)

Doubles: (6)

References

1977 births
Living people
Argentine male tennis players
Tennis players from Buenos Aires